Thomas Shaw (June 1899 – 2 March 2002) was the last known Irish World War I British Army veteran. He served in the Royal Irish Rifles after joining up in 1916 and fought in battles such as Passchendaele.

Biography 
Shaw was born in Belfast, Ireland (now Northern Ireland), in June 1899. He first enlisted as a rifleman at 15 in 1914 and went into battle, but was sent home after his brother, a military policeman, met him by chance while in France. In 1916 he joined the 16th battalion of the Royal Irish Rifles and fought in battles such as Messines and Passchendaele. He stayed in Germany as part of the Army of Occupation for six months after the war ended and returned home in April 1919.

During World War II he was in charge of meat rations in Belfast. In 1942, he married his girlfriend Nell; they spent the last 12 years living at sheltered accommodation in Savoy, Bangor, County Down.

A plaque in honour of Thomas Shaw was put up at the front door of the Savoy in Bangor on 4 August 2014

See also 
 List of last surviving World War I veterans by country
Photo of plaque at Savoy

1899 births
2002 deaths
Military personnel from Belfast
People from Bangor, County Down
British Army personnel of World War I
Irish centenarians
Men centenarians
Royal Ulster Rifles soldiers
Child soldiers in World War I